Edil Baisalov is a Kyrgyz politician, civil society activist who currently serves as the Kyrgyz Republic's Ambassador to the Court of St James's.  He played prominent role in the Tulip Revolution of 2005 and following the 2010 Kyrgyzstani uprising on April 7, 2010 briefly served as Chief of Staff of the interim government led by Roza Otunbayeva. In 1999-2007 Baisalov led the 'Coalition for Civil Society and Democracy', the largest Kyrgyz advocacy and election monitoring network.

Early life
He was born on August 6, 1977 in Bishkek and grew up in Naryn.  He studied in Turkey (1992–1993) and the United States (1994–1995) as an exchange student. He attended the American University of Central Asia and the Kyrgyz State National University.

Political career
In February 2003, the Kyrgyz government forcibly hospitalized Baisalov, preventing him from attending an NGO meeting.

Baisalov played a leading role in the Tulip Revolution of March 24, 2005.

Baisalov has campaigned against crime and corruption. On April 12, 2006 he survived an attempted assassination for his vocal criticism of President Kurmanbek Bakiyev's failure to battle organized crime.

In July 2006 he was the recipient of the American Bar Association's international rule of law award presented by the US Supreme Court Justice Ruth Bader Ginsburg with the following citation: "Edil Baisalov, President of the Coalition of NGOs for Democracy and Civil Society, Kyrgyzstan. Steadfast human rights advocate, he has promoted reform efforts designed to advance democracy and abate corruption in his country. He has persisted in doing so despite threats to, and even a violent assault on, his very life".In November 2006, Baisalov was involved in large anti-government demonstrations in Bishkek, acting as a spokesman for protesters. Shortly afterwards, Baisalov was again attacked in the Osh airport.

In August 2007 Baisalov joined the Social Democratic Party of Kyrgyzstan, chaired by then prime-minister Almazbek Atambaev.  He played an important role in consolidating democratic opposition to President Kurmanbek Bakiev.

On December 4, 2007 Edil Baisalov was removed by the Central Election Commission of Kyrgyzstan from the candidates list of the Social Democratic Party of Kyrgyzstan and barred from participating in the 2007 parliamentary elections.  Many activists and lawyers claimed this decision to be politically motivated and illegal.  It was alleged that Baisalov published the ballot on his blog and the General Prosecutor charged him with attempt to undermine integrity of elections.

Baisalov claimed that he was a victim of political vendetta and left Kyrgyzstan on December 8, 2007 for Kazakhstan and was resettled with his family in Sweden by UNHCR.

In 2012-2013 Edil Baisalov served as acting Minister for Social Development, and later as deputy Minister for Social Development, with the responsibility for children, elderly and the disabled. His refusal to declare a moratorium on the international adoptions attracted controversy.

On May 28, 2019 Foreign Affairs Committee of Jogorku Kenesh approved and nominated Baisalov to be the Kyrgyz Republic Ambassador to the United Kingdom.  His nomination was approved by the President Sooronbay Jeenbekov's decree on June 11, 2019. Edil Baisalov presented his credentials to Queen Elizabeth II on November 21, 2019, formally becoming Ambassador.

Quotes

"We should cherish our sovereignty. Central Asia is not anyone’s back yard."
"We came out to the streets to demand that the government stop merging with organized crime. We demand law and order."

References

External links
 Radio Free Europe biography (in Kyrgyz)
 'Who is who' page on Akipress  (in Russian)
 Baisalov's twitter account 
 Baisalov's LiveJournal blog (in Russian)

Living people
1977 births
People from Bishkek
Kyrgyzstani activists
Social Democratic Party of Kyrgyzstan politicians
American University of Central Asia alumni
Kyrgyz National University alumni